Josef Hagler (1 February 1893 – 1 August 1972) was an Austrian footballer. He played in one match for the Austria national football team in 1912.

References

External links
 

1893 births
1972 deaths
Austrian footballers
Austria international footballers
Place of birth missing
Association footballers not categorized by position